Kuyuluk Nature Park is a nature park in Turkey.

It is situated on the road to Fındıkpınarı in the southern slopes of the Toros Mountains. Its distance to Mersin is only . It was declared a picnic area in 1984 and a nature park in 2011.

It is surrounded by Turkish pine (Pinus brutia) and Mediterranean type scrub.

References

Nature parks in Turkey
2011 establishments in Turkey
Protected areas of Turkey
Parks in Mersin Province
Mezitli District